The Eastern North America Rift Basins are a series of sediment-filled aborted rifts created by large-scale continental extension. Their positions closely mirror the eastern coast of North America. Sediments and volcanic material from the rift basins are known as the Newark Supergroup.

Geology
Approximately 220 million years ago, during the late Triassic Period, the supercontinent Pangaea began to break apart. The focus of the rifting began somewhere between where present-day eastern North America and northwestern Africa were joined.

As in all rifting environments, grabens formed. Many of these grabens were created, but for some of them extension stopped before full rifting occurred. Where only partial rifting occurred, basins formed, analogous to the present-day Basin and Range Province in the western United States. By definition, a basin is any area that collects sediments. These "aborted rifts" (rifts that are tectonically inactive and no longer collecting sediments) extend from North Carolina to Newfoundland.

Along certain basins, rifting was not partial. Where full rifting occurred, the Atlantic Ocean was created. Along these rifts, magmatic activity never stopped, as shown by the ongoing eruption of lava along the Mid-Atlantic Ridge.

The basins are characterized by west to northwest dipping strata in the southern rifts (North Carolina to New York), while the northern ones (Connecticut to Nova Scotia) tend to dip northward. Many of the grabens have prominent signs of igneous activity, with diabase intrusions and basalt flows being quite common. Of these, the Palisades Sill in the Newark Basin shows a layer with an enrichment in olivine not found throughout the rest of the intrusions.

List
The following is a list of exposed rift basins, listed from south to north:
Wadesboro Basin
Sanford Basin
Durham Basin
Davie County Basin
Dan River and Danville Basins
Scottsburg
Basins north of Scottsburg
Farmville Basin
Richmond Basin
Taylorsville Basin
Scottsville Basin
Barboursville Basin
Culpeper Basin
Gettysburg Basin
Newark Basin
Pomperaug Basin
Hartford Basin
Deerfield Basin
Fundy Basin
Chedabucto Basin

See also
Jeanne d'Arc Basin

References

Letourneau, P. M., Olsen, P. E., The Great Rift Valleys of Pangea in Eastern North America. Volume 1. 2003
Puffer, J. H., Ragland, P. C., Eastern North America Mesozoic Magmatism, Special Paper - Geological Society of America, vol.268. 1992

Landforms of North America
Aulacogens
Geology of North America
Mesozoic rifts and grabens